Alternative Middle Years at James Martin School is a historic middle school located in the Port Richmond neighborhood of Philadelphia, Pennsylvania. It is part of the School District of Philadelphia. The building was built in 1894–1896, and expanded in 1922. It is a three-story, five-bay, stone building on a raised basement in the Romanesque style. It features portholes above the central three bays.

The building was added to the National Register of Historic Places in 1988.

References

External links

School buildings on the National Register of Historic Places in Philadelphia
Romanesque Revival architecture in Pennsylvania
School buildings completed in 1896
Port Richmond, Philadelphia
Public middle schools in Pennsylvania
School District of Philadelphia